In the Mountains of Yugoslavia is a 1946 Soviet drama film directed by Abram Room.

Plot 
The film tells about the confrontation of the Yugoslav People's Liberation Army together with the Red Army on the one hand and the German fascists on the other.

Starring 
 Ivan Bersenev as Josip Broz Tito
 Nikolay Mordvinov as Slavko Babić
 Olga Zhizneva as Andža
 Vsevolod Sanayev as Aleksey Gubanov
 T. Likar as Milica
 Ljubisa Jovanovic as Janko
 Misa Mirkovic as Simela (as M. Mirkovic)
 Braslav Borozan as Dragojlo (as B. Borozan)
 Vjekoslav Afric as Ivo / General Draža Mihailović
 Vladimir Skrbinsek as Hamdija
 Dragutin Todic as Blaza
 Stane Cesnik as Dusan
 Bojan Stupica as Field Marshal Erwin Rommel
 I. Cesar as General Schmulc
 Olivera Marković

References

External links 
 

1946 films
1940s Russian-language films
Soviet war drama films
1940s war drama films
Soviet black-and-white films
1946 drama films
Films about Josip Broz Tito
War films set in Partisan Yugoslavia
Cultural depictions of Draža Mihailović